Naninani II is an album of improvised music by American composer and saxophonist/multi-instrumentalist John Zorn and Yamataka Eye. It is a sequel to their previous album Nani Nani which was released in 1995.

Reception

The Allmusic review by Wade Kergan awarded the album 3½ stars stating "Choosing to turn inward rather than freaking out makes this the most satisfying meeting of Eye and Zorn yet". Pitchfork reviewer  Cameron Macdonald gave the album 7.7 out of 10 stating "I don't want to know the sight or smell of whoever produced those noises".

Track listing 
All compositions by John Zorn and Yamataka Eye
 "Fuckxotica" - 4:18
 "Hilo Himo" - 3:14
 "Shiso Baba" - 8:24
 "UFOFF" - 7:34
 "Bar Time with Eno" - 3:44 
 "Kiri Taki" - 3:44
 "4AB" - 1:54
 "Fat Anarchy on Airtube" - 9:37
 "Espimo" - 2:12
 "Macabro Delicato" - 2:13

Personnel 
 Yamataka Eye - voice, electronics, organ, banjo, steel guitar, electric fan, objects, percussion 
 John Zorn - alto saxophone, piano, tabla machine, Tibetan bells, percussion

References 

2004 albums
Albums produced by John Zorn
John Zorn albums
Tzadik Records albums